Materna is a 2020 American drama film directed by David Gutnik, starring Jade Eshete, Assol Abdullina, Kate Lyn Sheil and Lindsay Burdge.

Cast
 Jade Eshete as Mona
 Assol Abdullina as Perizad
 Kate Lyn Sheil as Jean
 Lindsay Burdge as Ruth
 Michael Chernus as David
 Rory Culkin as Gabe
 Cassandra Freeman as Wanda
 Sturgill Simpson as Paul
 Kaili Vernoff as Jean's Mom
 Jake Katzman as Jared
 Kara Young as Kara
 Zhamilya Sydykbaeva as Fatima
  as Aisha

Release
The film was released on VOD and on digital platforms on 10 August 2021.

Reception
On review aggregator Rotten Tomatoes, Materna holds an approval rating of 71%, based on 17 reviews.

Beatrice Loayza of The New York Times wrote that while each section "leaves its mark", the "glue uniting these women of different ethnicities and backgrounds reads like a failed attempt to carve a more ambitious meaning out of individual stories already brimming with possibility."

Nick Schager of Variety wrote that while the film "wisely doesn’t try to neatly resolve its multifaceted tensions", and the performances are "attuned to the material’s fundamental air of incompleteness and instability" the "forlorn and minimalist tone struck throughout proves too uniform, thanks in part to cinematography that — in each segment — segues similarly between intense close-ups and remote compositions in which figures are spied in dark, empty spaces or constricting doorways."

Jourdain Searles of The Hollywood Reporter called the film "thought-provoking", despite writing that Eshete's character "would have benefited from more screen time" and that Brudge's character is "by far the least developed."

Tomris Laffly of RogerEbert.com rated the film 2 stars out of 4 and called the film "less an Alejandro Iñárritu-style collection of interwoven connections, and more something that feels way too happenstantial", writing that what it "tries to say on race, class, culture, and society remains all too vague and surface-level in the aftermath."

References

External links
 
 

American drama films
2020 drama films